Sir Alfred Arnold MP (18 November 1835 – 31 October 1908) was a Cambridge educated barrister and an English politician.

Arnold was a Member of Parliament for Halifax between 1895 and 1900, as a member of the Conservative Party, and received a knighthood in 1903.

References

External links 
 

1835 births
1908 deaths
UK MPs 1895–1900
Conservative Party (UK) MPs for English constituencies